The 2004 FIA GT Zhuhai 500 km was the eleventh and final round the 2004 FIA GT Championship season.  It took place at the Zhuhai International Circuit, China, on November 14, 2004.

Following three straight races in which AF Corse's Maserati MC12s were allowed to race but ineligible for points, the FIA finally approved the car for homologation.  Although this meant that the MC12s were still restricted, Maserati was able to score their first and only points all season.

Official results
Class winners in bold.  Cars failing to complete 70% of winner's distance marked as Not Classified (NC).

Statistics
 Pole position – #1 BMS Scuderia Italia – 1:31.121
 Fastest lap – #1 BMS Scuderia Italia – 1:32.490
 Average speed – 160.850 km/h

References

 
 
 

Z
6 Hours of Zhuhai
2004 in Chinese motorsport